Amar a morir ("Love to Die") is a 2009 Mexican-Colombian drama film.  The film marks Fernando Lebrija's directorial debut. The movie was filmed in Mexico City, in the beached of the State of Michoacán and in the town of Ocelotitlán, Michoacán.

Plot 
Alejandro is a rich kid who is trying to escape from his own demons. In his journey he arrives to a beach town where he meets a girl, who shows him other side of life, a simple and beautiful side. But even in paradise, he encounters the demons he is trying to escape from.

Cast 
 José María de Tavira as Alejandro Vizcaíno.
 Martina García as Rosa.
 Alberto Estrella as Tigre.
 Craig McLachlan as Nick.
 Raúl Méndez as Tiburón.
 Mayra Serbulo as Amalia.
 Silverio Palacios as Pancho.
 Miguel Rodarte as Capitán Fernández.
 Luis Roberto Guzmán as Luis Ro.
 Catalina López as Flor.
 Sergio Jurado as Ricardo Vizcaíno.
 Renata Campos as Patricia Vizcaíno.
 Jimena Guerra as Rebeca Corcuera.
 Francisco Avendaño as Francisco Corcuera.
 Patricia Archer as Barbara Corcuera.
 Benjamín Martínez as Marcial.
 José Sefami as Pedro Gómez.
 Antonio Gaona as Paco.
 John Archer as Pelos.
 Jorge Becerril as Sargento Flores.

Awards 
The film debuted in the Festival Internacional de Cine de Santa Bárbara 2009, where it won the Nueva Vision Award to the best Latin Cinema film.

References

External links
 
 

2009 films
2009 drama films
Colombian drama films
Mexican drama films
2000s Spanish-language films
2000s Mexican films